This article lists mortalities from battles and individual military operations or acts of violence, sorted by death toll. For wars and events more extensive in scope, see List of wars and anthropogenic disasters by death toll. For natural disasters, see List of natural disasters by death toll.

Battles and sieges

Bombing campaigns

This section lists bombing campaigns in which at least 1,000 individuals may have been killed.

World War II
 80,000–130,000: American air forces' firebombings of Tokyo (1944–1945). Operation Meetinghouse, on the night of 9–10 March 1945, is the single most destructive bombing raid in human history. Of central Tokyo  were destroyed, leaving an estimated 100,000 civilians dead and over one million homeless.
 70,000–124,000: Atomic bombing of Hiroshima, by the United States
 22,000–102,000: Atomic bombing of Nagasaki, by the United States
 42,600: Allied air force bombing of Hamburg (Operation Gomorrah) during the period 24 July 1943 and 31 July 1943
 Minimum 40,000: German Luftwaffe bombing of London during the Blitz; 7 September 1940 to 11 May 1941
 22,700–25,000: Allied airforce bombing of Dresden during the period 7 October 1944 to 7 April 1945
 Minimum 20,000: Allied airforce bombing of Berlin in 363 separate raids that took place during the period 7 June 1940 until 25 March 1944
 Around 18,000: Royal Air Force bombing of Pforzheim on 23 February 1945
 Minimum 20,000 killed and wounded (to over 40,000): The U.S. Firebombing of Wuhan beginning on 18 December 1944
 Over 30,000 (10,000+ deaths): The Bombing of Chongqing (1938–1943); part of the War of Resistance-World War II

Post-World War II 
 40,000–150,000: U.S. bombing campaign of Cambodia (categorized as Operation Menu and Operation Freedom Deal) from 18 March 1969 to 15 August 1973
 1,400: Operation Linebacker II 'Christmas bombing' (Vietnam), 1972
 428 to 5,700: NATO bombing of Yugoslavia, 1999

Individual air raids
This section lists individual air campaigns in which at least 500 individuals may have been killed.

World War II

 100,000: Bombing of Tokyo (Operation Meetinghouse) on March 10, 1945, by the USAAF
 70,000–80,000: Atomic bombing of Hiroshima by the USAAF, (Japan, 1945)
 40,000: Bombing of Hamburg by the Allies (27–28 July 1943)
 35,000–40,000: Atomic bombing of Nagasaki by the USAAF, (Japan, 1945)
 17,000: Bombing of Pforzheim by Allies (Germany, February 23, 1945)
 3,000–4,000: Operation Punishment: Bombing of Belgrade by Nazi Germany (Yugoslavia, 1941)
 2,000–5,000: Bombing of Le Havre by Allied forces (France, 1944)
 1,500–4,000: Bombing of Caen by Allied forces (France, 1944)
 2,500: Bombing of Pearl Harbor by the Imperial Japanese Navy (United States, 1941)
 1,200: Allied bombing of Belgrade (Yugoslavia, 1944)
 800–900: Bombing of Rotterdam by Germany (Netherlands, May 14, 1940)
 800: Bombing of Nijmegen by the USAAF (Netherlands, February 22, 1944)
 511: Bombing of The Hague by the RAF (Netherlands, March 3, 1945)

Other
 153–800: Bombing of Guernica (26 April 1937)

War-related ship disasters
This section lists the ships which were sunk as well as their fatalities in relations to war, whether against enemy, friendly, or neutral ships.

Prior to World War I

World War I
The loss of two British cruisers to a German naval squadron at the Battle of Coronel on 1 November 1914 was followed by the Battle of the Falkland Islands on 8 December where most of the German force was destroyed.
The Battle of Jutland on 31 May 1916 was the largest naval battle during World War I and resulted in the loss of three British battlecruisers and three armored cruisers.

Interwar period

World War II

Post-World War II

Non-state (terrorist) attacks

This section lists terrorist attacks in which at least 100 individuals were killed.

Mass unrest, riots and pogroms

This section lists events in which at least 100 individuals were killed from riots or mass unrest.

Human sacrifice and mass suicide

This section lists notable individual episodes of mass suicide or human sacrifice. For tolls arising from the systematic practice of suicide or sacrifice, see Human sacrifice and ritual suicide.

See also

Other lists organized by death toll
 List of accidents and disasters by death toll
 List of disasters in Australia by death toll
 List of disasters in Canada by death toll
 List of disasters in Great Britain and Ireland by death toll
 List of disasters in New Zealand by death toll
 List of disasters in the United States by death toll
 List of murderers by number of victims
 List of natural disasters by death toll
 List of ongoing armed conflicts
 List of wars and anthropogenic disasters by death toll

Other lists with similar topics
List of accidents and incidents involving commercial aircraft
List of events named massacres
List of famines
List of fires
List of invasions
List of non-state terrorist incidents
List of riots
List of tropical cyclones
Lists of battles
Lists of disasters
Lists of earthquakes
Lists of rail accidents
Outline of war

Topics dealing with similar themes
 Democide
 Famine
 Genocide
 Genocides in history
 Infection
 List of battles by casualties
 Mass murder

Notes

References

External links
Bloodiest Battles of the 20th Century
Death Tolls for Battles of the 16th, 17th, 18th & 19th Centuries
Wars of the 20th Century
The world's worst massacres Whole Earth Review
War Disaster and Genocide
Killers of the 20th Century
Soviet Prisoners of War: Forgotten Nazi Victims of World War II
 on AirDisaster.com
Maritime disasters of World War II
List of Maritime disasters sorted by number of casualties
The Royal Islamic Strategic Studies Centre: English Publication "Body Count" This publication quantifies the human death toll of religious and political violence throughout the last two millennia and relates these to religio-cultural civilizations.

Lists of disasters
Lists by death toll
Death-related lists
War casualties

ang:Dēaðes toln
et:Hukkunute arv